Wahidullah Ali (born 29 November 1999) is an Afghan cricketer. He made his Twenty20 debut on 10 September 2020, for Boost Defenders in the 2020 Shpageeza Cricket League.

References

External links
 

1999 births
Living people
Afghan cricketers
Boost Defenders cricketers